Lillasyster is a Swedish rock band formed in Gothenburg in 2006. They released their debut album, Hjärndöd musik för en hjärndöd generation (Braindead Music For A Braindead Generation) in May 2007.

History
Lillasyster (meaning Little Sister) was formed as Rallypack in 2004, by former LOK members Martin Westerstrand (lead vocals) and Daniel Cordero (bass). After a while, Rallypack changed the name to Lillasyster. In February 2007 their first single "Berätta det för Lina" ("Tell It to Lina" in English) was released and in May 2007 they released their first album. They are also known for their cover versions of R&B star Rihanna's "Umbrella" the same year (2007) and Katy Perry's "Roar" (2014) which became successful.
The style of Lillasyster's music is very similar to LOK's music.

They participated in Melodifestivalen 2021 with the song "Pretender", qualifying to the second chance round on 6 February 2021. They performed again on 6 March 2021 but failed to progress to the final.

They returned to Melodifestivalen the following year, entering the 2022 edition with the song "Till Our Days Are Over". They performed on 26 February 2022, finishing fourth in the first round and progressing to the semi-final. They performed again on 5 March 2022 but finished fourth, failing to qualify to the final.

Discography

Studio albums
Sod Off, God! We Believe in Our Rockband (2004) (as Rallypack)
Hjärndöd musik för en hjärndöd generation (2007)
Det Här Är Inte Musik Det Här Är Kärlek (2009)
3 (2012)
4 (2016)
Svensk Jävla Metal (2021)
Stormtrooper Boombox (2023)

Compilation albums
Hjärndöd Kärlek (2010)
Tala är silver, skrika är guld (2013)

EPs
Svensk Jävla Metal (2018)

Singles
"Berätta det för Lina" (2007)
"Rad efter Rad (Dreamhack Anthem)" (2009)
"Jag Är Här Nu" (2009)"
"Så jävla bra" (2011)"

Videos
"Berätta det för Lina" (2007)
"Umbrella ella ella" (Rihanna cover) (2007)

Charting singles

Members
Martin Westerstrand - Lead vocals
Max Flövik - Guitar
Andy OhMyGod - Bass
Ian-Paolo Lira - Drums

Other contributors
Thomas Silver - Additional guitars
Daniel Cordero left the band in 2011 and Andy Oh'MyGOD has taken the place as bass player now.

References

External links
 

Swedish alternative metal musical groups
Swedish nu metal musical groups
Swedish metalcore musical groups
Swedish-language musical groups
Musical groups from Gothenburg
Melodifestivalen contestants of 2022
Melodifestivalen contestants of 2021